The Chicago Maroons football team represents the University of Chicago in college football. The Maroons, which play in NCAA Division III, have been a football-only member of the Midwest Conference since 2017. The University of Chicago was a founding member of the Big Ten Conference and the Maroons were coached by Amos Alonzo Stagg for 41 seasons. In 1935, halfback Jay Berwanger became the first recipient of the Downtown Athletic Club Trophy, later known as the Heisman Trophy. In the late 1930s, university president Robert Maynard Hutchins decided that big-time college football and the university's commitment to academics were not compatible. The university abolished its football program in 1939 and withdrew from the Big Ten in 1946. Football returned to the University of Chicago in 1963 in the form of a club team, which was upgraded to varsity status in 1969. The Maroons began competing in Division III in 1973.

History

The program began play in 1892, with coach Amos Alonzo Stagg at the helm, where he would serve for until 1933. The team's name came bout when Stagg decided the team needed to change in its color from goldenrod, with Stagg pointing out how the color soiled easily. On May 5, 1894, students and faculty met to determine the official color and nickname, with the result being the Maroons. The Maroons spent their first four seasons as an independent, with 1894 being a highlight year in which they went 10–7–1. They joined the Big Ten Conference in 1896. In 1899, they won their first Big Ten title, going 12–0–2 in regular play and 4-0 in conference play. Stagg formed a squad that would be fairly consistent for a quarter of a century, with the Maroons winning seven conference titles from 1899 to 1924, while managing to have four seasons in which they did not lose a game. 

Stagg retired from Chicago after the 1932 season, in which the team went 3–4–1 (1–4), and then coached at the University of the Pacific. Clark Shaughnessy took over as the Maroons football coach in 1933. In his seven seasons he led them to two .500 records, but no finish above 6th in the conference. In 1936, they beat Wisconsin 7–6. As it turned out, this was their last win as a Big Ten member. The team disbanded in 1939. Chicago fielded a football team again for the 1969 season. The team struggled for a few years, not getting to .500 until 1976, with a 4-4 record, and not getting above .500 until 1985. The first few decades were marked by losing, with four winless seasons occurring from 1973 to 1991. In 1994, Dick Maloney was hired as coach of the team. His 1995 team went 8–2, the Maroons' most wins in a season since coming back as a team. In 1998, the Maroons won the UAA conference title, winning all four of its conference games. The Maroons won three more conference titles under Maloney, who retired in 2012. Chris Wilkerson was hired as coach in 2013. In his second season, he led them to a UAA title.

Conference affiliations
 Independent (1892–1895)
 Big Ten Conference (1896–1939)
 No team (1940–1962)
 Club team (1963–1968)
 Independent (1969–1972)
 Division III Independent (1973–1975)
 Midwest Collegiate Athletic Conference (1976–1987)
 University Athletic Association (1988–2016)
 Southern Athletic Association (2015–2016)
 Midwest Conference (2017–present)

Championships

National championships
Chicago lays claim to two national championships. Although they do not compete in the NCAA Division I Football Bowl Subdivision, they maintain claims to titles won at the highest level at the time.

Conference championships
Chicago has won 12 conference championships, seven in the Big Ten Conference and five in the University Athletic Association

All-time record against current Big Ten members

Note: Michigan State, Penn State, Nebraska, Maryland, and Rutgers were not members of the Big Ten when Chicago was a member.
'''

Notable personnel

College Football Hall of Fame

Others
Walter S. Kennedy, quarterback for Stagg's 1898–1899 teams
Walter E. Marks, fullback and halfback, 1924–1926; leader of Chicago's last Big Ten championship team
Nelson Norgren, played football under Stagg, coached Chicago basketball team, 1921–1942, 1944–1957
Laurens Shull, All-American, killed in action during World War I
Frederick A. Speik, end, All-American, 1904
Herman Stegeman, played for 1913 national championship; later coached football, baseball, basketball and track at Georgia
John Webster Thomas, fullback, All-American 1922, played for Stagg 1921–1923
Mysterious Walker, played for Stagg, 1904–1906; coached college teams, 1907–1940
Graham Kernwein, played for Stagg, 1923–1925; later played in the NFL

See also
 List of NCAA Division III football programs
 Chicago Maroons

References

External links
 

 
American football teams established in 1892
1892 establishments in Illinois